Reading Bridge is a road bridge over the River Thames at Reading in the English county of Berkshire. The bridge links the centre of Reading on the south bank with the Lower Caversham area of the cross-river suburb, and former village, of Caversham on the north bank. It crosses the river a short way above Caversham Lock.

The current bridge is the first on the site, and was built in 1923 as part of the political accommodation when Reading absorbed Caversham. Before then the only road crossing between the two places was at the much more historic Caversham Bridge site some half mile upstream.

See also 
Crossings of the River Thames

References

External links 
 

Bridges in Reading, Berkshire
Bridges completed in 1923
Bridges across the River Thames
1923 establishments in England
Road bridges in England